"Speak to Me" is a song by Swedish pop music duo Roxette, released on 18 April 2011 as the second commercial single from their eighth studio album, Charm School. The single version of the track was a remix created by Swedish producer Bassflow. The song was released internationally, excluding in Germany and Austria, where "Way Out" was released as the second and final single from the album. The track failed to appear on any international sales charts, although it peaked in the top twenty of Finland's Radiosoittolista chart, and also entered the Russian TopHit chart. The music video was directed by Mikael Sandberg.

Formats and track listings
All songs written by Per Gessle.
 Download
 "Speak to Me"  – 3:35
 "Stars"  – 4:07

 Promo CD
 "Speak to Me"  – 3:42
 "Speak to Me"  – 3:35
 "Speak to Me"  – 3:35

 CD single 
 "Speak to Me"  – 3:35
 "Speak to Me"  – 3:42
 "Stars"  – 4:07

 7" single 
 "Speak to Me"  – 3:35
 "Speak to Me"  – 3:42
 "She's Got Nothing On (But the Radio)"  – 5:34
 "She's Got Nothing On (But the Radio)"  – 3:30

Personnel
Credits adapted from the liner notes of Charm School Revisited.

 Demo recorded at Tits & Ass Studio in Halmstad, Sweden on 13 July 2010
 Backing track and Per Gessle's vocals recorded at The Aerosol Grey Machine in Vallarum, Sweden in August 2010
 Marie Fredriksson's vocals recorded at Atlantis Studio in Stockholm, Sweden in October 2010

Musicians
 Marie Fredriksson – lead and background vocals
 Per Gessle – lead and background vocals, production
 Peter Boström – additional production and remixing 
 Tom Coyne – mastering 
 Christoffer Lundquist – bass, guitars, keyboards, programming, engineering, production and mixing
 Clarence Öfwerman – keyboards, programming and production
 Mats "M.P." Persson – engineering

Charts

References

2011 singles
Roxette songs
Songs written by Per Gessle